Henry Madin (7 October 1698 – 3 February 1748) was a French composer at the Chapelle royale and music theorist.

Biography
Madin was born in Verdun of Irish parents who had left Ireland in the early 1690s with the Wild Geese and settled in Verdun. His first music studies took place in Verdun, among the children singing in the cathedral school. After having directed church choirs at the cathedrals of Meaux, Verdun, Tours, and Rouen), Madin moved to Versailles, where he was first active for the King's service, in 1738, after having ensured membership in the royal chapel. From 1741, protected by Louis XV, Madin was appointed Governor of the Pages, succeeding the composer André Campra. After his release in 1740, he shared the responsibilities with the composers Esprit Antoine Blanchard and Jean-Joseph Cassanéa de Mondonville until his death in Versailles).

In 1742 Madin published a treatise on counterpoint,  Traité de contrepoint simple, which was inspired by Louis-Joseph Marchand's earlier 1739 publication Traité du contrepoint simple, ou Chant sur le livre.

Editions
 Henry Madin, Les Messes. Edited by Jean-Paul C. Montagnier (Versailles: Centre de musique baroque de Versailles, 2003).
 Henry Madin, Te Deum. Edited by Jean-Paul C. Montagnier (La Petite-Raon, Nancy: Entreprise & culture en Lorraine, 2017).

Recordings
 Henry Madin Te Deum pour les victoires de Louis XV. Ensemble Stradivaria, Les Cris de Paris, directed by Daniel Cuiller (Paris: Alpha-Classics, 2016; Alpha 963).

Bibliography
 Jean-Paul C. Montagnier: Henry Madin (1698–1748). Un musicien Lorrain au service de Louis XV (Langres: Éditions Dominique Guéniot, 2008).
 Jean-Paul C. Montagnier: "De Galway à Verdun: les origines irlandaises du compositeur Henry Madin", in: Le Pays lorrain, vol. 108 no. 92 (December 2011), p. 375–377.
 Jean-Paul C. Montagnier: The Polyphonic Mass in France, 1600–1780: The Evidence of the Printed Choirbooks (Cambridge: Cambridge University Press, 2017).
Jean-Paul C. Montagnier, "The War of the Austrian Succession and the Masses by Henry Madin (1741-1748)", in: Music & Letters, 100 (August 2019), pp. 391–419.

References

1698 births
1748 deaths
18th-century French composers
18th-century French male musicians
French Baroque composers
French male classical composers
French male composers
People from Verdun
17th-century male musicians